System Center Operations Manager (SCOM) is a cross-platform data center monitoring system for operating systems and hypervisors.  It uses a single interface that shows state, health, and performance information of computer systems.  It also provides alerts generated according to some availability, performance, configuration, or security situation being identified.  It works with Microsoft Windows Server and Unix-based hosts.

History 

The product began as a network management system called SeNTry ELM, which was developed by the British company Serverware Group plc.  In June 1998 the intellectual property rights were bought by Mission Critical Software, Inc. who renamed the product Enterprise Event Manager.  Mission Critical undertook a complete rewrite of the product, naming the new version OnePoint Operations Manager (OOM).  Mission Critical Software merged with NetIQ in early 2000, and sold the rights of the product to Microsoft in October 2000. It was later renamed into Microsoft Operations Manager (MOM) - in 2003, Microsoft began work on the next version of MOM: It was called Microsoft Operations Manager 2005 and was released in August 2004. Service Pack 1 for MOM 2005 was  released in July 2005 with support for Windows 2003 Service Pack 1 and SQL Server 2000 Service Pack 4. It was also required to support SQL Server 2005 for the operational and reporting database components. The development for the next version—at this time its codename was “MOM V3”—began in 2005. Microsoft renamed the product System Center Operations Manager and released System Center Operations Manager 2007 in March 2007. System Center Operations Manager 2007 was designed from a fresh code base, and although sharing similarities to Microsoft Operations Manager, is not an upgrade from the previous versions.

2009 
In May 2009 System Center Operations Manager 2007 had a so-called “R2” release - the general enhancement was cross platform support for UNIX and Linux servers. Instead of publishing individual service packs, bug fixes to the product after System Center Operations Manager 2007 R2 were released in the form of so-called cumulative updates (CUs).

Central concepts 

The basic idea is to place a piece of software, an agent, on the computer to be monitored.  The agent watches several sources on that computer, including the Windows Event Log, for specific events or alerts generated by the applications executing on the monitored computer. Upon alert occurrence and detection, the agent forwards the alert to a central SCOM server. This SCOM server application maintains a database that includes a history of alerts.  The SCOM server applies filtering rules to alerts as they arrive; a rule can trigger some notification to a human, such as an e-mail or a pager message, generate a network support ticket, or trigger some other workflow intended to correct the cause of the alert in an appropriate manner.

SCOM uses the term management pack to refer to a set of filtering rules specific to some monitored application.  While Microsoft and other software vendors make management packages available for their products, SCOM also provides for authoring custom management packs. While an administrator role is needed to install agents, configure monitored computers and create management packs, rights to simply view the list of recent alerts can be given to any valid user account.

Several SCOM servers can be aggregated together to monitor multiple networks across logical Windows domain and physical network boundaries.  In previous versions of Operations Manager, a web service was employed to connect several separately-managed groups to a central location. As of Operations Manager 2007, a web service is no longer used. Rather, a direct TCP connection is used, making use of port 5723 for these communications.

Integration with Microsoft Azure 
To monitor servers which are running at Microsofts Cloud Infrastructure Azure it is possible to enable Log Analytics Data Sources which are collecting and sending their data to on premises SCOM Management Servers. 

In November 2020 Microsoft announced the plan to make SCOM a fully cloud managed Instance at their Azure Environment, Codename was "Aquila".

The Command Shell 
Since Operations Manager 2007 the product includes an extensible command line interface called The Command Shell, which is a customized instance of the Windows PowerShell that provides interactive and script-based access to Operations Manager data and operations.

Management Pack 
SCOM can be extended by importing management packs (MPs) which define how SCOM monitors systems.  By default, SCOM only monitors basic OS-related services, but new MPs can be imported to monitor services such as SQL servers, SharePoint, Apache, Tomcat, VMware and SUSE Linux.

Many Microsoft products have MPs that are released with them, and many non-Microsoft software companies write MPs for their own products as well.

Whilst a fair amount of IT infrastructure is monitored using currently available MPs, new MPs can be created by end-users in order to monitor what is not already covered.

Management Pack creation is possible with the System Center Operations Manager 2007 R2 Resource Kit, Visual Studio with Authoring Extensions and Visio MP Designer.

Versions

See also 
 Microsoft System Center
 Official SCOM Build Version List
 System Center Configuration Manager
 System Center Data Protection Manager
 System Center Virtual Machine Manager
 Microsoft Servers
 Oracle Enterprise Manager
 IBM Director

References

Literature

External links 
 System Center Operations Manager
 Microsoft Tech Net guide on MOM
 Microsoft Operations Manager SDK (in MSDN)
 Introducing System Center Operations Manager 2007 A tutorial by David Chappell, Chappell & Associates
 Operations Manager 2007 R2 Management Pack Authoring Guide (from UK TechNet)
 System Center Central (System Center community)
 TechNet Ramp Up: Learn how to install, implement and administer Operations Manager 2007 R2.
 Blog of Blake Drumm
 Blog of Kevin Holman regarding SCOM
 Blog of Kevin Justin
 Blog of Leon Laude for System Center
 Blog of Tom Ziegler
 Blog of Udish Mudiar

Windows Server System
Information technology management